A bogomil is an adherent of bogimilism, a Bulgarian dualist sect.

Bogimil may also refer to:
Bogomil (priest), a 10th-century Bulgarian priest
Bogomil (name), a Bulgarian name
Bogomil (village), a village in Bulgaria
Bogomil Cove